Derek Showard, better known by the stage name GrandMixer DXT, is an American musician, one of the earliest to use turntables as a musical instrument in the 1980s.

Early in his career, he was known as Grand Mixer D.ST, a reference to Delancey Street on the Lower East Side of Manhattan, New York City. He was featured in the influential hip hop film Wild Style.

Widely recognized as a pioneer, Grand Mixer DXT is credited as being the first turntablist. He was the first person to establish the turntable as a fully performable and improvisational musical instrument (Alberts 2002). Especially important is his technique of altering the pitch of the note or sound on the record.

He is also credited with helping to popularize DJing through his scratching on Herbie Hancock's single "Rockit", from the Bill Laswell and Material produced album Future Shock. He is featured in the 2001 documentary, Scratch.

Discography
With Ginger Baker
 Horses & Trees (Celluloid, 1986)
With Herbie Hancock
 Future Shock (Columbia, 1983)
 Sound System (Columbia, 1984)
 Perfect Machine (Columbia, 1988)
With Jah Wobble
 Heaven and Earth (Island Records, 1995)
With King T
 IV Life (MCA, 1994)
With Bill Laswell
 Akasha (Subharmonic, 1995)
 Jazzonia (Douglas, 1998)
 Aftermathematics (Subharmonic, 2003)
With Praxis
 Profanation (Preparation for a Coming Darkness) (NAGUAL, 2008)
With Sly and Robbie
 Rhythm Killers (Island Records, 1987)

References

External links
Grand Mixer DXT discography at Discogs

DJ Grand Mixer DXT Interview - NAMM Oral History Library (2013)

American hip hop DJs
Living people
Year of birth missing (living people)
Musicians from New York City